The 1904–05 season was Manchester United's 13th season in the Football League. United finished 3rd in the Second Division. The Reds also competed in the FA Cup, but failed to get past the Intermediate Round stage, losing to Fulham.

Second Division

FA Cup
Manchester United entered the 1904–05 FA Cup at the Intermediate Round stage and were drawn at home to Fulham on 14 January 1905. The match finished 2–2, with goals from Tommy Arkesden and Charles Mackie. The replay was played four days later away at Craven Cottage, and ended scoreless. On 23 January, Fulham and United played a second replay at the neutral venue of Villa Park, which Fulham won by a single goal.

Squad statistics

References

Manchester United F.C. seasons
Manchester United